Aschach an der Steyr is a municipality in the district of Steyr-Land in the Austrian state of Upper Austria.

Geography
Aschach lies in the Traunviertel. About 16 percent of the municipality is forest, and 73 percent is farmland.

References

Cities and towns in Steyr-Land District